Gilah (also, Gilakh) is a village in the Qusar Rayon of Azerbaijan.  The village forms part of the municipality of Xuluq.

References 

Populated places in Qusar District